Timothy Zahn (born September 1, 1951) is an American writer of science fiction and fantasy. He is known best for his prolific collection of Star Wars books, chiefly the Thrawn series, and has published several other series of sci-fi and fantasy novels of his own original creation, in addition to many works of short fiction.

Early life
Zahn grew up in Lombard, Illinois and attended Glenbard East High School in Lombard. He then went on to Michigan State University, before working towards a doctorate in physics at the University of Illinois.

Career

Zahn's novella Cascade Point won the 1984 Hugo Award. He is the author of the Blackcollar trilogy and the Cobra series (nine novels so far), fourteen Star Wars expanded universe novels, including thirteen novels featuring Grand Admiral Thrawn: the Thrawn trilogy, the Hand of Thrawn duology, Outbound Flight, Choices of One, Thrawn, Thrawn: Alliances, Thrawn: Treason, and the Thrawn Ascendancy trilogy.

Lucasfilm at times used some of the more detailed Star Wars: The Roleplaying Game supplements from West End Games as references, and West End sent boxes of their sourcebooks to Zahn when he started work on a new Star Wars novel trilogy. At the time, Zahn was writing Heir to the Empire (1991), the first book in what became known as the Thrawn trilogy, and West End in turn released sourcebooks from 1992–1994 based on Zahn's three novels.

The Thrawn trilogy marked a revival in the fortunes of the Star Wars franchise, bringing it widespread attention for the first time in years; all three Thrawn trilogy novels made the New York Times Best Seller List, and set the stage and tone for most of the franchise's expanded universe content. Zahn also wrote the young adult Dragonback series and the popular Conquerors trilogy.

Bibliography

References

External links
Timothy Zahn's page at Tor Books
Timothy Zahn's page at Open Road Media

Timothy Zahn interview with RoqooDepot.com for Mara Month, May 7, 2012
Timothy Zahn interview with RoqooDepot.com at Star Wars Celebration VI, August 25, 2012
Timothy Zahn 'Scoundrels' interview with RoqooDepot.com, December 31, 2012
 Timothy Zahn at ComicBookDb.com

20th-century American novelists
21st-century American novelists
American male novelists
American science fiction writers
Hugo Award-winning writers
1951 births
Living people
Michigan State University alumni
Grainger College of Engineering alumni
American male short story writers
American comics writers
20th-century American short story writers
21st-century American short story writers
20th-century American male writers
21st-century American male writers
People from Bandon, Oregon